Ebrima Darboe (born 6 June 2001) is a Gambian professional footballer who plays as a defensive midfielder for  club Roma and the Gambia national team.

Early life 
Ebrima Darboe was born in Bakoteh, a district of Serekunda in The Gambia. He left his birth country aged 14, alone, arriving in Libya, before sailing to Sicily, Italy, where he arrived as a refugee after a six-month journey.

In Italy, Darboe was taken in charge by the  – a service from the Italian ministry of the Interior – as an unaccompanied underage migrant and ended in Rieti, where he started playing with amateur club Young Rieti.

Club career 
Darboe joined Italian club Roma in summer 2017, making his primavera debut for the youth team in January 2019. Darboe signed his first professional contract with Roma the following July, having just turned eighteen. He first featured on as an unused substitute in Roma's 2–1 Serie A home victory against Milan on 27 October 2019. Darboe scored his first goal for the under-19 side in October 2020, and got an additional brace later that month in the Campionato Primavera.

Darboe made his professional debut for the club on 2 May 2021, coming off the bench for the final ten minutes of Roma's 2–0 defeat against Sampdoria. On 6 May, Darboe made his UEFA Europa League debut against Manchester United, in the second leg of the semi-finals. Darboe played in the Derby della Capitale against rivals Lazio on 15 May, becoming the first player born in the 2000s to do so.

International career 
On 26 October 2020, while still a youth team player for Roma, Darboe received his first senior call-up for the Gambia national team by head coach Tom Saintfiet. He debuted for the Gambia in a 2–0 friendly win over Niger on 6 June 2021.

He played in the 2021 Africa cup of Nations, his national team's first continental tournament, where they made a sensational quarter-final.

Honours 
Roma
 UEFA Europa Conference League: 2021–22

References

External links
 Profile at the A.S. Roma website
 

2001 births
Living people
Gambian footballers
The Gambia international footballers
Association football midfielders
People from Serekunda
A.S. Roma players
Serie A players
2021 Africa Cup of Nations players
Gambian expatriate footballers
Expatriate footballers in Italy
Gambian expatriate sportspeople in Italy
UEFA Europa Conference League winning players